Rekjuani is a census town in the Rajarhat CD block in the Bidhannagar subdivision of the North 24 Parganas district in the state of West Bengal, India.

Geography

Location

Area overview
Rajarhat, a rural area earlier, adjacent to Kolkata, is being transformed into an upmarket satellite township, with modern business hubs, luxury real estate and eye-catching shopping malls. With enormous construction activity taking place all around, things are changing fast, leaving behind a description at any given point of time as outdated in no time. Bidhannagar subdivision consists of Bidhannagar Municipality, Mahishbathan II Gram Panchayat and Rajarhat-Gopalpur Municipality (subsequently merged to form Bidhannagar Municipal Corporation since 2015), including Nabadiganta Industrial Township (Bidhannagar Sector - V) and Rajarhat (Community development block).

Note: The map alongside presents some of the notable locations in the subdivision. All places marked in the map are linked in the larger full screen map.

Demographics
According to the 2011 Census of India, Rekjuani had a total population of 16,553, of which 8,417 (51%) were males and 8,136 (49%) were females. Population in the age range 0–6 years was 1,717. The total number of literate persons in Rekjuani was 12,969 (87.42% of the population over 6 years).

Infrastructure
According to the District Census Handbook, North Twenty Four Parganas, 2011, Rekjuani covered an area of 6.3115 km2. The protected water-supply involved overhead tanks, service reservoir, tube well/ borewell, handpump. It had 1,520 domestic electric connections. Among the educational facilities, it had 6 primary schools, 1 secondary school, senior secondary school at Bhatenda 2 km away. The nearest college was 7 km away at Bidhannagar. It had 1 recognised shorthand, typewriting & vocational training institution. Among the social, cultural and recreational facilities, it had 1 cinema theatre, 2 public libraries, 1 reading room. It is well-known for medicine, printing, net factory.

Healthcare
Rekjoani Rural Hospital with 30 beds functions as the main medical facility centre in Rajarhat CD block.

References

Cities and towns in North 24 Parganas district